The 2005 Guia Race Of Macau was the final of the 2005 World Touring Car Championship season. It was held at the Circuito da Guia. Augusto Farfus won the first race for Alfa Romeo, the race being Farfus's first win in the series. The second race was a crash-strewn affair, won in the end by Duncan Huisman. Andy Priaulx won the inaugural FIA WTCC world championship after finishing 2nd in both races.

Race 1

Race 2

Standings after the races

Drivers' Championship standings

Manufacturers' Championship standings

References

External links

Guia
Macau Grand Prix
2005 in Macau sport
2005 in Chinese motorsport